Depułtycze Królewskie  is a village in the administrative district of Gmina Chełm, within Chełm County, Lublin Voivodeship, in eastern Poland.

During the January Uprising, on August 5, 1863, it was the site of the Battle of Depułtycze, in which Polish insurgents defeated Russian troops.

References

Villages in Chełm County